Akola Lok Sabha constituency is one of the 48 Lok Sabha (parliamentary) constituencies in Maharashtra state in central India.

Assembly segments
Presently, after the implementation of the Presidential notification on delimitation in 2008, Akola Lok Sabha constituency comprises six Vidhan Sabha (legislative assembly) segments. These segments (with their constituency numbers and reservation status) are:

Members of Parliament

^ by-poll

Election results

General Elections 2019

General Elections 2014

General elections 2009

See also
 Buldhana Lok Sabha constituency (1951 elections as Buldhana Akola Lok Sabha constituency electing two seats)
 Khamgaon Lok Sabha constituency (1962,1967,1971 elections to 3rd,4th,5th Lok Sabha)
 Washim Lok Sabha constituency (1977 to 2004 elections for 6th to 14th Lok Sabha)
 Akola district
 Washim district
 List of Constituencies of the Lok Sabha

References

External links
 Previous Lok Sabha Members by Constituency Lok Sabha website
Akola lok sabha  constituency election 2019 results details

Lok Sabha constituencies in Maharashtra
Washim district
Akola district